The 2014–15 season was Parma Football Club's sixth consecutive season back in Serie A after having been promoted from Serie B at the end of the 2008–09 season. The team competed in Serie A and the Coppa Italia. Parma were relegated at the end of the season, facing bankruptcy and finishing 20th, having been in 20th place for the greater part of the season. The 2014–15 season was thus the last in which Parma F.C. competed as an organisation.

Players

Squad information
.

Out on loan

At Gubbio

At Paganese

At  Gorica

Transfers

In

Out

Competitions

Serie A

League table

Results summary

Results by round

Matches

Coppa Italia

Statistics

Appearances and goals

|-
! colspan="10" style="background:#dcdcdc; text-align:center"| Goalkeepers

|-
! colspan="10" style="background:#dcdcdc; text-align:center"| Defenders

|-
! colspan="10" style="background:#dcdcdc; text-align:center"| Midfielders

|-
! colspan="10" style="background:#dcdcdc; text-align:center"| Forwards

|-
! colspan="10" style="background:#dcdcdc; text-align:center"| Players transferred out during the season

Goalscorers

Last updated: 6 February 2015

Disciplinary Record

<small>
Last updated: 6 February 2015

References

Parma Calcio 1913 seasons
Parma